Nicolas Keller (born 27 May 1963) was a Swiss footballer who played in the 1980s. He played as midfielder, but also as defender.

Keller first played for Chiasso in the 1980–81 Nationalliga A and 1981–82 seasons. 

Keller then joined FC Basel's first team during their 1982–83 season under head coach Rainer Ohlhauser. Keller played his domestic league debut for his new club in the away game on 16 April as Basel were defeated 0–1 by Sion.

Keller played three season for the club and during that time he played a total of 17 games for Basel without scoring a goal. Ten of these games were in the Nationalliga A and seven were friendly games.

References

Sources
 Die ersten 125 Jahre. Publisher: Josef Zindel im Friedrich Reinhardt Verlag, Basel. 
 Verein "Basler Fussballarchiv" Homepage

FC Chiasso players
FC Basel players
Swiss men's footballers
Association football defenders
Association football midfielders
1963 births
Living people